Trenton  is a city and the only incorporated municipality in Dade County, Georgia, United States—and as such, it serves as the county seat. The population was 2,195 at the 2020 census. Trenton is part of the Chattanooga, Tennessee–GA Metropolitan Statistical Area.

History
Founded in the 1830s, the area was originally known as Salem. In 1839 Salem was designated the seat of the newly formed Dade County. It was renamed Trenton in 1841. The present name is a transfer from Trenton, the state capital of New Jersey.

Geography
Trenton is located at  (34.875609, −85.508644).

The city is located in the northwestern part of the state along Interstate 59, which runs from southwest to northeast to the west of the city, leading northeast  to Chattanooga, Tennessee (via I-59 to I-24), and southwest  to Birmingham, Alabama. U.S. Route 11 and Georgia State Route 136 are the main roads through the center of the city, with U.S. 11 leading northeast to Chattanooga and southwest  to Fort Payne, Alabama. GA-136 leads southeast  to LaFayette and west  to the Alabama state line.

Demographics

2020 census

As of the 2020 United States census, there were 2,195 people, 1,025 households, and 700 families residing in the city.

2010 census
As of the census of 2010, there were 2,301 people, 904 households, and 599 families residing in the city. The racial makeup of the city was 95.5% White, 0.7% African American, 0.3% Native American, 0.8% Asian, 0.2% Pacific Islander, 0.9% from other races, and 1.7% from two or more races. Hispanic or Latino of any race were 3.2% of the population.

There were 904 households, out of which 31.6% had children under the age of 18 living with them, 46.9% were married couples living together, 14.5% had a female householder with no husband present, and 33.7% were non-families. 29.2% of all households were made up of individuals who lived alone, and 12.9% of those were someone living alone who was 65 years of age or older. The average household size was 2.40 and the average family size was 2.94.

In the city, the population was spread out, with 27.0% under the age of 18, 15.3% from 20 to 29, 12.7.2% from 30 to 39, 31.0% from 40 to 64, and 13.7% who were 65 years of age or older. The median age was 35.9 years. For every 100 females, there were 98.36 males. For every 100 females age 18 and over, there were 94.18 males in the same age group.

The median income for a household in the city was $34,612, and the median income for a family was $40,450. Males had a median income of $31,354 versus $22,104 for females. The per capita income for the city was $16,336. About 10.5% of families and 13.4% of the population were below the poverty line, including 17.5% of those under age 18 and 11.4% of those age 65 or over.

Flag

In 2001, Georgia replaced its state flag, as some citizens had objected that its design incorporated the Confederate battle flag. That year, Trenton city officials adopted the old state flag as a city flag. The city had already used it from 1956 to 2001 as an official city banner. (This followed the 1954 United States Supreme Court ruling in Brown v. Board of Education that racially segregated public education was unconstitutional.) After adopting the former state flag for the city in 2001, the Trenton City Council also voted to post a  plaque bearing the Ten Commandments at city hall. The city flies the flag outside the city hall/police department building and in the city park next to the courthouse and library. In addition, many local businesses fly it.

The city also flies one of the historic flags of the Confederate States of America, the Blood-Stained Banner, in the city park.

Education
The Dade County School District administers grades pre-school to grade twelve. It operates two elementary schools, a middle school, and a high school. The district has 167 full-time teachers and over 2,630 students.
Dade Elementary School
Davis Elementary School
Dade Middle School
Dade County High School

Attractions
Cloudland Canyon State Park
Dade County Courthouse is listed on the National Register of Historic Places listings in Georgia (National Register of Historic Places).

Major roads and travel
Interstate 24: I-24 dips into northeastern Dade County, Georgia as it circles around Aetna and Raccoon Mountains in Tennessee. 
Interstate 59: I-59 runs north and south and connects Birmingham to Chattanooga
U.S. Route 11 runs north and south, parallel to Interstate 59
State Route 136: Hwy 136 runs west and east and connects Dade County to Walker County.
Norfolk Southern Railway

Media
Dade County Sentinel (weekly newspaper)
Discover Dade (Local media portal and news service)
WKWN AM 1420, FM 106.1, and FM 101.3 (A mix of local and syndicated content, including local weather and traffic)

Notable people
 Bella French Swisher (1837–1893), writer

See also

List of municipalities in Georgia (U.S. state)
National Register of Historic Places listings in Dade County, Georgia

References

External links
Trenton, Georgia at the Chickamauga Campaign Trail
Trenton, Georgia at Georgia.gov

1854 establishments in Georgia (U.S. state)
Cities in Dade County, Georgia
Cities in Georgia (U.S. state)
Cities in the Chattanooga metropolitan area
County seats in Georgia (U.S. state)
Populated places established in 1854
Chattanooga metropolitan area county seats